Cleopatra Koheirwe is a Ugandan actress, writer, singer and media personality. She first appeared onscreen as Joy in The Last King of Scotland in 2006. She has since garnered numerous roles on different film and television projects locally and internationally including a role on Netflix's Sense8 as Mother in season 2.

Cleopatra plays Ebony in the new Nana Kagga directed and produced series Reflections alongside other Uganda celebrities Malaika Nnyanzi, Housen Mushema, Andrew Kyamagero, Prynce Joel Okuyo and Gladys Oyenbot.

Koheirwe joined StarTimes Uganda in June 2019 as the new Public Relations Manager.

Career

Musical artist (since 2001)
In 2001, she joined a popular music, dance and drama group known as Obsessions (now Obsessions Africa) until March 2007 when she resigned from the group to continue on her own path.

In 2010, she started working on her solo singing career after friends and fans encouraged her to perform again. Her first single titled Ngamba, a Luganda word that means, "Tell me" was a pop song, about deceptive relationships. The song was well received and given airplay on a couple of radio stations in Uganda.

Towards the end of 2011, Cleopatra was signed to the Cypher Studios label under the management of Jimmy ‘The Beatmekah’ Okungu. She released her first solo music video for her song titled "Party on my Mind" in April 2012 and collaborated with Kenyan dancehall artist Levysill on her third single "Lay You Down" in 2013. Both videos and audios of the two singles managed to get impressive airplay on TV and radio stations in East Africa, mainly Kenya and Uganda. Cleopatra writes most of her songs inspired by things around her, her experiences and those of others.

Radio host (since 2003)
Cleopatra's first radio gig was at 91.3 Capital FM (Uganda) in 2003/2004 as a co-host on the Drive Time Show (Now Overdrive Show) from 3pm to 7pm. She also co-presented The Dream Breakfast on Saturdays from 6am to 10am with Hakeem Saga a.k.a. Hakeem the Dream.

In 2008, she worked at KIU FM hosting The Left Drive from 3pm- 7pm and her own created show Rock & Soul on Saturday from 10pm to 2pm.

In 2011, she got back into radio and was co-hosting a show called The Jam at Radiocity 97fm every Monday to Friday between 3pm to 7pm with her former colleague, Hakeem Saga.

In 2013, while still at Radiocity 97Fm, she became a co-host of the U-Request show. She took a maternity break in December 2013 and went to Kenya. In October 2016, she resumed working at Radiocity as a co-host of the Mid-Morning Magazine with Peace Menya until the end of May 2019 when she moved to StarTimes.

Television

Television host (2004–2013)
She worked as a TV host, particularly at WBS TV between 2004 and 2009. She hosted shows such as; Showtime Magazine, a show about travel, art, theatre, music, film and personalities, Meet Our Leaders, a show where she interviewed Members of Parliament and went around with them in their constituencies talking about the positive work they were doing, Fitness Watch, a health and fitness program where she took the viewers through a workout and gave health tips. In 2013, she was a guest deejay/presenter on the Citizen TV show Sakata Mashariki in Kenya.

Television judge (2011–2013)
In 2011, she was chosen to be a judge on a WBS TV show dubbed The Icon, a show that was searching for the next TV star. In 2012, she was a judge on a musical show titled UG Factor, in which the next talented music star was being looked for.

In September 2013, Cleopatra joined Flavia Tumusiime and Tusker Project Fame judge and singer Juliana Kanyomozi as audition judges for Tusker Project Fame 6 in Kampala. They were tasked with auditioning and selecting Uganda's representatives to the Tusker Project Fame Academy in Nairobi, Kenya.

In 2013, she was a guest judge on the M-Net talent show titled Maisha Superstar.

Actress

Theatre
Cleopatra has been acting since her high schools in stage plays. Her first professional stage play she acted in was The Republic of Feminia as a dancer in 1999 while at Namasagali College. She also acted as Madam Matahari and dancer in The Secret Agent in 2000. In 2012, she acted in the Namasagali College Alumni play titled The Happy Life Hotel.

She continued acting in stage plays when she joined Obsessions playing the role of a dancer in Cleopatra in 2001, Princess Elminia in Queen of Sheeba, Queen in Heart of a Dancer and Queen in Legend of the Sceptre. She also acted in Adam and Eve.

Film and television
In 2006 Cleopatra auditioned for her first screen acting role for The Last King of Scotland in 2006 in which she played a character named Joy. She has since appeared in a number of both film and television productions locally and internationally as well as winning nominations for some of the productions. She has worked on Changes: an M-Net TV series in seasons 1 and 2 in a supporting role as Nanziri Mayanja from 2008 to 2010, Be the Judge, a Kenyan local TV series as Lucy Mango in 2010, Yogera film (2011) playing a double lead role, State Research Bureau (S.R.B) film (2011) in a supporting role as Faith Katushabe.

She also worked in Kona, an M-Net TV series where she plays Jakki, a wannabe boxer trying to reconnect with her father, a boxing coach. She appeared in Sense8, a Netflix Original Series as Mother. Cleopatra is set to appear in the new Nana Kagga directed TV series Reflections as Ebony, one of the main four protagonists of the series.

Writer (since 2005)
Cleopatra was the pioneer staff writer and then Celebrity & Features Editor at African Woman Magazine from 2005 when the magazine started, until July 2012. She did freelance writing for a Health & Sanitation Magazine, Magazine7, and contributed to websites such as Music Uganda and UG Pulse. Cleopatra was also a contributor to Drum Magazine Kenya from 2014 to 2015.

Motivational work
Cleopatra loves to motivate and mentor people especially the youths. In 2011, she participated and appeared in a campaign dubbed ‘Speak Out-No Fear’, that was against domestic violence and child abuse under the Domestic Violence & Child Protection Awareness Program.

In 2012 Cleopatra was approached by the director of Unlock Foundation, a non-profit organization that seeks to address critical educational gaps in rural African schools, and asked to participate in a photo campaign that gives encouragement to the youth. Her character and work in the industry later earned her a nomination for Teeniez Role Model at the Buzz Teeniez Awards 2013.

Still in 2012, she was chosen by Reach a Hand Uganda (RAHU), an NGO that aims at empowering the youth, to speak to youths in various schools. After completing the school tours, RAHU commended her as ‘Mentor of the Week’. Cleopatra was one of the first cultural icons at Reach a Hand Uganda (RAHU) and was actively involved until 2014 when she had to take a break from work to raise her baby.

Training
In August 2017, she was among the six professional film people selected from Africa, along with successful Nigerian actor OC Ukeje to attend an intense 3-week workshop/training in Los Angeles at the Relativity School's Los Angeles Centre Studios (LACS). She was awarded a certificate in Acting for Camera.

In 2010 while in preparation to shoot CHANGES season 2, Cleopatra and the principal cast that included Nick Mutuma, Pierra Makena, Nini Wacera, Patricia Kihoro were taken through acting training of The Meisner Technique by Rob Mello, a professional acting coach from Rob Mello Studios Atlanta, USA.

Education background
Cleopatra studied at Nakasero Primary School (P.L.E), Bugema Adventist Secondary School (UCE) and Namasagali College (UACE) and Makerere University. She is a graduate with an Honors bachelor's degree in Social Sciences. She also has a Certificate in Community Journalism from the University of South Africa (UNISA).

Personal life
Cleopatra was the only child born to Jocelyn Twinesanyu "Sanyu" Rwekikiga and Anthony Abamwikirize Bateyo in 1982. She never met her father as he had died prior to her birth. Her mother died when she was 15. Cleopatra has a daughter who was born in 2014 with boyfriend Lwanda Jawar, a Kenyan actor, model, and stunts director/coordinator. She delivered a baby girl named Aviana Twine Jawar on 22 January 2014. She named her daughter Twine after her mother Twinesanyu. She then took a break from her career to raise her baby.

Filmography

Nominations and awards

References

External links
 
 

Living people
Ugandan film actresses
Ugandan television actresses
People from Kampala
Ugandan television presenters
21st-century Ugandan actresses
Ugandan stage actresses
Makerere University alumni
University of South Africa alumni
Ugandan radio presenters
Ugandan musicians
Ugandan writers
1982 births
Ugandan women radio presenters
Ugandan women television presenters